Route 124 is a highway in central Missouri.  Its eastern terminus is at Route 22/151 in Centralia; its western terminus is at Route 240 east of Fayette.

Route 124 begins outside the small town of Fayette.  About a half mile east of the town, and just passed Boone Femme Creek, Route 124 splits off of Route 240.  After winding through a half mile of farmland, it intersects with the combined Routes H and HH.  After two miles of farmland, Route 124 joins with Route A for one mile, before Route A splits off to the north.

Major intersections

References

124
Transportation in Howard County, Missouri
Transportation in Audrain County, Missouri
Transportation in Boone County, Missouri